Caitlin Cleveland is a Canadian politician, who was elected to the Legislative Assembly of the Northwest Territories in the 2019 election. She represents the electoral district of Kam Lake.

References 

Living people
Members of the Legislative Assembly of the Northwest Territories
Women MLAs in the Northwest Territories
People from Yellowknife
21st-century Canadian politicians
21st-century Canadian women politicians
Year of birth missing (living people)